Flavio Germán Davino Rodríguez (born August 15, 1974, in León, Guanajuato) is a Mexican former professional footballer.

Club career
Flavio began his career in top-flight football with his current club Tecos. In winter 1997, he was transferred to León and later to Monarcas Morelia. For eight seasons, he played with Morelia and in apertura 2002. Then he got transferred to Cruz Azul. He retired in 2006 as a player but continues being in the soccer arena, but now to study to become coach.

International career
He appeared with the Mexico national football team in 2001 under the wing of Enrique Meza in an exhibition match against Bulgaria of which was held in Morelia, Michoacán.

Personal life
He is the son of the former Argentine footballer Jorge Davino, and the brother of Duilio Davino. Davino is also of Italian descent.

Honours

Morelia
 Mexican Primera División: Invierno 2000

References

External links

1974 births
Living people
Mexican people of Argentine descent
Sportspeople of Argentine descent
Sportspeople from León, Guanajuato
Footballers from Guanajuato
Association football midfielders
Mexican footballers
Mexico international footballers
Tecos F.C. footballers
Club León footballers
Atlético Morelia players
Cruz Azul footballers
Mexican football managers
Mexican people of Italian descent